Raging Fire is a 2021 Hong Kong-Chinese action film written, produced and directed by Benny Chan in his final directorial effort before his death on 23 August 2020. The film stars Donnie Yen as a righteous cop who crosses path with his former protege, played by Nicholas Tse, who is out for revenge on his former mentor for putting him in prison in the past.

The film was released on 30 July 2021 in Mainland China and on 19 August 2021 in Hong Kong.

Plot
Cheung Sung-bong is an officer of the Regional Crime Unit who worked in the front line for many years and cracked many major cases. However, he is seen as an outcast due to his extremely righteous character which affected his career, but his protege, Yau Kong-ngo, respects him as a good officer although Yau does not completely agree with Cheung's overly hard-boiled style and believes in taking shortcuts. Yau manages to reach up to Cheung's level. However, fate unexpectedly brings them to different paths and pits them against one another.

Cast

Music
The film's theme song, titled Confrontation (對峙), is composed and performed by Nicholas Tse, with lyrics written by Kenny So. A promotional song for the film was also released as a tribute to director Benny Chan, which is a cover of the song A Real Man (真的漢子), which was originally composed and performed by George Lam, with lyrics written by Cheng Kwok-kong. The new version is performed by Andy Lau, Donnie Yen, Wu Jing, Nick Cheung and Jordan Chan, with slightly altered lyrics written by Keith Chan.

Production
The film was first announced at the 2019 Hong Kong Film & TV Market (FILMART). Producer and star Donnie Yen revealed that the film had originally been planned to be filmed in a foreign country, but he persuaded co-producer and director Benny Chan to stay in Hong Kong for filming. Production began in April of the same year. On 6 May 2019, a scene was filmed involving Yen jumping from a balcony for which he was suspended on wires for two hours. The film held its blessing ceremony on 23 July 2019 at a constructed set on Peking Road in Quarry Bay Film Studio that was attended by Emperor Group head Albert Yeung, Chan, Yen and the rest of the cast and crew. Production for the film wrapped up in September 2019.

On 23 August 2020, director Chan died from nasopharyngeal cancer. It was reported that he had fallen ill during the film's production and had later been diagnosed with the illness. Chan completed his directing duties for the film but was unable to take part in post-production due to his illness.

Release
Raging Fire was theatrically released in China on 30 July 2021, followed by a limited release in the United States on 13 August 2021, and in Hong Kong on 19 August 2021.

Reception

Box office
As of 10 October 2021, Raging Fire has grossed US$225 million worldwide, combining its gross from Hong Kong (US$3.3 million), China (US$221.2 million), North America (US$368,301), Australia (US$54,211), New Zealand (US$2,417) and Taiwan (US$172,558).

In Hong Kong, the film debuted at No. 2 during its opening weekend, grossing HK$7,592,576 (US$974,544) during its first four days of release. On its second weekend, the film grossed HK$8,775,780, coming in at No. 1, and have grossed a total of HK$16,368,356 (US$2,101,717) by then. During its third week, the film grossed HK$5,271,353, coming in at No. 2, and have grossed a total of HK$21,636,628 (US$2,783,956) by then. On its fourth weekend, the film remained at No. 2 where it grossed HK$2,749,226 and have grossed a total of HK24,385,854 (US$3,135,396) so by then. During its fifth weekend, the film grossed HK$1,049,458, coming in No. 5, and have accumulated a total gross of HK$25,435,312 (US$3,268,144) so far.

In China, the film debuted at No. 1 during its opening weekend, grossing US$40.5 million during its first three days of release. On its second weekend, the film grossed US$49.2 million, remaining at No. 1, and have grossed a total of US$89.7 million by then. The film remained at first place during its third weekend, grossing US$42.5 million, and have accumulated a total gross of US$132.3 million so far. The film stayed at No. 1 again for four consecutive weeks, grossing US$25.1 million during its fourth weekend and have grossed a total of US$157.9 million by then. During its fifth weekend, the film grossed US$19.2, coming in at No. 2 behind new release Free Guy, and have grossed a total of US$177.1 million by then. On its sixth week, the film grossed US$13.1 million, remaining at No. 2, and have grossed a total of US$190.2 million by then. During its seventh week, the film grossed US$10.7 million, coming in at No. 3, and have accumulated a total gross of US$200.9 million by then. On its eighth week, the film grossed US$8.8 million, remaining at No. 3, and have grossed a total of US$209.7 million so far.

Critical reception
Matthew Monagle of the Austin Chronicle gave the film 4/5 stars and praises the characterizations and action set pieces  Lim Lian-yu of Yahoo! Singapore gave the film a score of 3.5/5 stars, describing the film as "126 minutes worth of explosive action that is bound to entertain and keep your eyes busy." Edmund Lee of the South China Morning Post gave the film a score of 3/5 stars, praising it as "the best that Hong Kong action-film making has to offer", but criticizing its illogical story and crude script.

G. Allen Johnson of the San Francisco Chronicle praises the film's action scenes but criticizes the exposition scenes which drags the film. Cary Darling of the Houston Chronicle praises director Chan's execution of a basic premise and the action choreography as "breathlessly exhilarating." Anna Smith of Deadline Hollywood describes the film as "an accomplished visual feat with detailed fight choreography and strong physical performances", while also noting its underdeveloped characterizations and overuse of flashbacks.

Marc Zirogiannis of Tae Kwon Do Life Magazine wrote, "In Raging Fire, Benny Chan's final directorial work, Yen combines the elements of his persona as an action star and dramatic actor for a successful result.  His dramatic engagement equals his action prowess, and these elements combine to make this film superior."

Awards and nominations

Notes

References

External links

怒火 Raging Fire on Facebook
Raging Fire - 英皇電影 Emperor Motion Pictures

2021 action thriller films
2021 martial arts films
2020s police films
Hong Kong action thriller films
Hong Kong martial arts films
Hong Kong detective films
Hong Kong films about revenge
Chinese action thriller films
Chinese detective films
Police detective films
2020s Cantonese-language films
Emperor Motion Pictures films
Films directed by Benny Chan
Films set in Hong Kong
Films shot in Hong Kong
Tencent Pictures films